Curtis Matthew "Curt" Kirkwood (born January 10, 1959) is an American musician, best known as the guitarist, singer and primary songwriter for alternative rock group Meat Puppets.

Biography
Curt Kirkwood formed the Meat Puppets along with his brother Cris on bass, and drummer Derrick Bostrom.  The trio went in a hiatus in 1996 after a long career where the band became hailed as one of the premier and innovative indie bands as well as briefly achieving mainstream success in the early 1990s.  As the group's lead vocalist and primary songwriter (including solely penning most of the band's best-known songs: "Plateau," "Oh, Me," "Lake of Fire," "Up on the Sun," "Backwater," etc.), Curt is the sole member of the original trio to have played in all of the band's incarnations since 1980. 

He re-formed the Meat Puppets in 1999 with Kyle Ellison (guitar), Andrew Duplantis (bass) and Shandon Sahm (drums) to complete one studio album, Golden Lies, released in 2000. The new lineup disbanded in 2002 after the departure of Duplantis. After the Meat Puppets, Curt toured as a solo act before banding together with Nirvana bassist Krist Novoselic and Sublime drummer Bud Gaugh to form Eyes Adrift. They released a self-titled album in 2002 and toured the United States before going separate ways. Curt then formed another band, Volcano, which only released one album, before he decided to focus on his solo career. His first solo album Snow was released in October 2005.

He is also an artist and created the cover art for several Meat Puppets albums, as well as for Stephen Beachy's novel The Whistling Song. In 2006, the Meat Puppets re-formed with Cris back on bass and drummers Ted Marcus and Shandon Sahm serving as replacements for Derrick Bostrom until he returned to the band in 2018. Since reforming, the band has released five new albums, Rise to Your Knees (2007), Sewn Together (2009), Lollipop (2011), Rat Farm (2013) and Dusty Notes (2019).

Personal life
Kirkwood is the grandson of Carl W. Renstrom, who was owner of Tip-Top Products and a multi-millionaire from Omaha, Nebraska.

Discography

Meat Puppets

Nirvana
 MTV Unplugged in New York (1993)

Eyes Adrift
 Eyes Adrift (2002)

Volcano
 Volcano (2004)

Solo
 Snow (2005)

The Dean Ween Group
 The Deaner Album (2016)

References

External links

 Interview with Curt Kirkwood by Jarrod Dicker
 Meat Puppets' new official website, maintained by the band and Anodyne Records.
 Meat Puppets' original website, maintained by original drummer Derrick Bostrom
 Live Repository
 Moonglampers Ramble - a music blog primarily focusing on live Meat Puppets.
 Little Dog Records' Curt Kirkwood Page
 Silver Wonder Press, Kirkwood designed cover for book by Lee Ranaldo, "Hello From the American Desert"

1959 births
Living people
American male singers
American punk rock singers
American punk rock guitarists
Musicians from Phoenix, Arizona
Meat Puppets members
Music of Austin, Texas
Guitarists from Arizona
American male guitarists
20th-century American guitarists
Eyes Adrift members
Volcano (supergroup) members